The 2018–19 College of Charleston Cougars men's basketball team represented the College of Charleston during the 2018–19 NCAA Division I men's basketball season. The Cougars, led by fifth-year head coach Earl Grant, played their home games at the TD Arena in Charleston, South Carolina as members of the Colonial Athletic Association.

Previous season
The Cougars finished the 2017–18 season 26–8, 14–4 in CAA play to share the regular season title with Northeastern. At the CAA tournament they defeated Drexel, William & Mary, and Northeastern to become CAA Tournament champions. They earned the CAA's automatic bid to the NCAA tournament as a #13 seed where they lost in the first round to Auburn.

Offseason

Departures

2018 recruiting class

2019 recruiting class

Roster

Schedule and results

|-
!colspan=12 style=| Exhibition

|-
!colspan=12 style=| Non-conference regular season
|-

|-
!colspan=12 style=| CAA regular season

|-
!colspan=12 style=| CAA tournament

|-

Source

References

College of Charleston Cougars men's basketball seasons
College of Charleston
College of Charleston
College of Charleston